Fretter is a surname. Notable people with the surname include:

Colton Fretter (born 1982), Canadian professional ice hockey forward
Vera Fretter (1905–1992), British conchologist, and one of the authors (with Alastair Graham) of British Prosobranch Molluscs

See also
Fret (disambiguation)
Fretter, an electronics and major appliance retailer based out of Detroit, Michigan, founded in the 1950s by Oliver "Ollie" Fretter
Otto Fretter-Pico (1893–1966), highly decorated major-general in the Wehrmacht during World War II
Maximilian Fretter-Pico (1892–1984), German general during World War II